A creel is a wicker basket usually used for carrying fish or blocks of peat. It is also the cage used to catch lobsters and other crustaceans.

In modern times it has come to mean a range of types of wicker baskets used by anglers or commercial fishermen to hold fish or other prey. The word is also found in agriculture and for some domestic baskets.

In the North Sea herring industry of the nineteenth and twentieth centuries, the creel was a basket used to measure the volume of a catch. The standard measure were creel, which were made in officially approved volumes of one half and one quarter cran (another unit for measuring fresh herring).

An angler's creel is designed to function as an evaporative cooler when lined with moss and dipped into the creek in order to keep the catch chilled. Caught fish are inserted through a slot in the top which is held in place by a small leather strap.

Creels are also the high sides added to a towed trailer. This makes the trailer more suitable for carrying loose material, such as turf etc.

Creels in Scotland
The word creel is also used in Scotland (chiefly in the north) to refer to a device used to catch lobsters and other crustaceans. Made of woven netting (similar to that used in traditional fishing net) over a frame of plastic tubing and a slatted wooden base, this type of creel is analogous in function to a lobster pot.   Several creels put out on one line can be referred to as a "leader".

See also
 Fly fishing
 Weaving (mythology)
 Basket weaving
 Lobster pot

References

External links
 Northumbria Basketry Group
 : for its etymology

Containers
Basket weaving
Fishing equipment
Food storage containers